The Capitol Guide Board was a group of three members who have jurisdiction over the United States Capitol Guide Service.  The three members of this board were the Architect of the Capitol Stephen T. Ayers, the Senate Sergeant at Arms Frank J. Larkin, and the House Sergeant at Arms Paul D. Irving.  The title holders of these positions make up the Capitol Police Board, which has jurisdiction over the United States Capitol Police. The board was abolished in 2008.

Guide Board
Guide Board
2008 disestablishments in Washington, D.C.
Government agencies disestablished in 2008